Jim Gossman (born 25 September 1955) is a former Scotland international rugby union player.

Rugby Union career

Amateur career

He played for West of Scotland FC.

He played for a Saltires side in the Melrose Sevens in 1980; they beat Clarkston in the First Round 22–14, and beat Cambuslang 24–0 in the Second Round, but were beaten in the semi-finals by Melrose 20–10.

Provincial career

He played for Glasgow District.

International career

He was capped for Scotland 'B' twice, his first cap against Ireland 'B' on 1 December 1979.

He was capped for Scotland once in 1980, against England.

Family

His brother Bryan Gossman was also capped for Scotland.

References

Sources

 Bath, Richard (ed.) The Scotland Rugby Miscellany (Vision Sports Publishing Ltd, 2007 )

Living people
Scotland international rugby union players
Scottish rugby union players
West of Scotland FC players
1955 births
Scotland 'B' international rugby union players
Glasgow District (rugby union) players